The following events occurred in July 1925:

July 1, 1925 (Wednesday)
The Kuomintang proclaimed a national government from its base in Guangzhou.
The Netherlands held a general election, in which the General League of Roman Catholic Caucuses maintained its plurality.
The first International Congress of Radiology opened in London. 
Born: Farley Granger, actor, in San Jose, California (d. 2011)
Died: Erik Satie, 59, French composer

July 2, 1925 (Thursday)
Harry Greb retained the World Middleweight Title, defeating Mickey Walker by decision at the Polo Grounds in New York.
Born: Medgar Evers, civil rights activist, in Decatur, Mississippi (d. 1963)
Died: Nikolai Golitsyn, 75, last Prime Minister of the Russian Empire (executed)

July 3, 1925 (Friday)
The German government sent a strong protest note to the Soviet Union over the sentencing of three German students to death for "high treason and spying". Numerous German newspapers called for a break in diplomatic relations between the two countries as many were convinced that the charges were trumped up in order to arrange for an exchange of prisoners.
Suzanne Lenglen of France defeated Joan Fry of the United Kingdom in the Women's Singles Final at Wimbledon.

July 4, 1925 (Saturday)
Police in Rome reported that the treasury of St. Peter's Basilica was robbed of 5–7 million lira worth of valuables, including gold crosses and other religious objects.
René Lacoste defeated fellow French tennis player Jean Borotra in the Men's Singles Final at Wimbledon.
44 died in Boston when the Pickwick Club collapsed.
Amusement park Belmont Park opened in San Diego, California.

July 5, 1925 (Sunday)
The Charley Chase short comedy film Isn't Life Terrible? was released.
Born: Fernando de Szyszlo, artist, in Lima, Peru (d. 2017)

July 6, 1925 (Monday)
Numerous arrests were made and stolen items were recovered in the St. Peter's Basilica robbery case. Six workmen who were doing repairs in the vicinity of the treasury room were among those arrested.
Born:
 Merv Griffin, television personality and media mogul, in San Mateo, California (d. 2007)
Bill Haley, rock and roll musician, in Highland Park, Michigan (d. 1981)

July 7, 1925 (Tuesday)
William Jennings Bryan arrived by train in Dayton, Tennessee to a hero's welcome as national anticipation of the Scopes Trial accelerated. Bryan gave a fiery speech saying the trial would be a "duel to the death".
Died: Clarence Hudson White, 54, American photographer

July 8, 1925 (Wednesday)
The Riffians launched a new offensive against the city of Fes in the Rif War.
Defense lawyer Clarence Darrow arrived in Dayton, Tennessee to much less fanfare than that afforded Bryan the previous day.

July 9, 1925 (Thursday)
The French Chamber of Deputies approved an additional 183 million francs to fight the Rif War.

July 10, 1925 (Friday)
The Scopes Monkey Trial began in Dayton, Tennessee with jury selection.
Born: Mahathir Mohamad, 4th and 7th Current Prime Minister of Malaysia, in Alor Setar (alive in 2021)

July 11, 1925 (Saturday)
France and Spain agreed to coordinate their efforts in the Rif War.
Born: David Graham, actor, in London, England (alive in 2021); Sid Smith, hockey player, in Toronto, Ontario, Canada (d. 2004)

July 12, 1925 (Sunday)
The Greek-language Turkish newspaper Apoyevmatini was founded.
Born: Rosie Harris, author, in Cardiff, Wales (alive in 2021); Roger Smith, Chairman and CEO of General Motors, in Columbus, Ohio (d. 2007)

July 13, 1925 (Monday)
The film The Lucky Devil starring Richard Dix was released.
Walt Disney married Lillian Bounds in Idaho.

July 14, 1925 (Tuesday)
The Occupation of the Ruhr began to wind down as the first French and Belgian troops evacuated. 
Born: Hugh Gillin, actor, in Galesburg, Illinois (d. 2004)
Died: Francisco Guilledo, better known by his ring name of "Pancho Villa", 23, Filipino-born World Flyweight Champion of boxing

July 15, 1925 (Wednesday)
A petition carrying 460,000 signatures was presented in the Reichstag calling for Prohibition to be enacted in Germany.
Born: Badal Sarkar, dramatist and theatre director, in Calcutta, British India (d. 2011)

July 16, 1925 (Thursday)
The Canadian province of Saskatchewan repealed the Prohibition Act of 1916. The government continued to control wholesale outlets for the selling and distribution of alcohol.

July 17, 1925 (Friday)
A joint manifesto signed by 40 prominent Indians was publicized, calling for the British government to give home rule to India.
Norway passed the Svalbard Act.
Died: Lovis Corinth, 66, German painter (pneumonia)

July 18, 1925 (Saturday)
Adolf Hitler published Volume 1 of his autobiographical manifesto Mein Kampf.
Flooding in Seoul, Korea killed hundreds as dikes broke on the third straight day of heavy rain.
Born: Friedrich Zimmermann, politician, in Munich, Germany (d. 2012)

July 19, 1925 (Sunday)
Italian cyclist Ottavio Bottecchia won the Tour de France for the second straight year.

July 20, 1925 (Monday)
Italy and Yugoslavia signed the Treaty of Nettuno, permitting Italians to freely immigrate to Dalmatia. Its ratification was held up in the Yugoslav parliament for three years as the Croatian Peasant Party staunchly opposed it. 
Near Montecatini Terme in Italy, a gang of Fascists attacked opposition figure Giovanni Amendola, ambushing his car in the dead of night and beating him savagely. Details of the attack were censored in government-controlled media to avoid another outcry along the lines of the Matteotti scandal. Amandola died of his wounds nine months later.
A solar eclipse occurred.
Born: Jacques Delors, economist, in Paris; Frantz Fanon, psychiatrist and philosopher, in Fort-de-France, Martinique, France (d. 1961)

July 21, 1925 (Tuesday)
The Scopes Trial ended with John Scopes being found guilty of violating the Butler Act and fined $100, which both William Jennings Bryan and the American Civil Liberties Union offered to pay for him. After the verdict was read Scopes made his only statement during the trial, vowing to "oppose this law in any way I can. Any other action would be in violation of my ideal of academic freedom — that is, to teach the truth as guaranteed in our constitution, of personal and religious freedom."
The Battle of al-Kafr was fought in the Great Syrian Revolt.
The Council of People's Commissars passes a resolution mandating use of the metric system throughout the Soviet Union. 
Born: Johnny Peirson, hockey player, in Winnipeg, Manitoba, Canada (d. 2021)

July 22, 1925 (Wednesday)
The Ethel Smyth comic opera Entente Cordiale was first performed at the Royal College of Music in London. The performance was broadcast on the BBC.

July 23, 1925 (Thursday)
The Miners' Federation of Great Britain called for a miners' strike starting on July 31.
Born: Gloria DeHaven, actress and singer, in Los Angeles (d. 2016)

July 24, 1925 (Friday)
Britain enacted the first Palestinian Citizenship Order, 1925, officially outlining the legal definition of a Palestinian for the first time.

July 25, 1925 (Saturday)
The Telegraph Agency of the Soviet Union was established.

July 26, 1925 (Sunday)
The French team of Robert Benoist and Albert Divo won the 1925 French Grand Prix, though the race was marred by the death of Antonio Ascari.
Petrovsky Stadium opened in Leningrad.
Born: Joseph Engelberger, physicist, engineer and entrepreneur, in Brooklyn, New York City (d. 2015); Ana María Matute, Spanish writer (d. 2014) 
Died: Antonio Ascari, 36, Italian race car driver (crashed while leading the French Grand Prix); William Jennings Bryan, 65, American politician and associate of the prosecution in the Scopes Trial; Gottlob Frege, 76, German mathematician and philosopher

July 27, 1925 (Monday)
Chicago Tribune correspondent George Seldes was ordered to leave Italy for refusing to alter the tone of his dispatches which displeased the Mussolini government.

July 28, 1925 (Tuesday)
Ex-Kaiser of Germany Wilhelm II made it known in a statement to the United Press through his spokesperson Hubert von Rebeur-Paschwitz that he believed the Treaty of Versailles should be scrapped, explaining, "The criminal and impossible treaty of Versailles has disarmed Germany and left Europe and the world bereft of the greatest factor of peace. You will agree that the greatest danger to Europe and the United States of America lies in the fact that the thus disarmed central Europe is surrounded by a number of nations all armed to the teeth and continually increasing their armaments."
Born: Baruch S. Blumberg, scientist and recipient of the Nobel Prize in Physiology or Medicine, in Brooklyn, New York (d. 2011); Juan Alberto Schiaffino, footballer, in Montevideo, Uruguay (d. 2002)

July 29, 1925 (Wednesday)
Vatican newspaper L'Osservatore Romano printed a long list of Fascist offenses against Catholics.
A new law was announced in a semi-official Italian publication stating that any newspaper publishing attacks on the government that were "too strong and too frequent" would receive two warnings, after which the paper would no longer be recognized,
Born: Ted Lindsay, hockey player, in Renfrew, Ontario, Canada (d. 2019); Shivram Dattatreya Phadnis, cartoonist and illustrator, in Bhoj, Karnataka, British India (alive in 2021); Mikis Theodorakis, songwriter, in Chios, Greece (d. 2021)

July 30, 1925 (Thursday)
Negotiations between the British government and representatives of the country's nearly one million coal miners entered their final hours before a nationwide miner's strike over wages was set to begin at midnight. Leaders of the railway and transport workers issued notices to their workers telling them not to handle coal when the strike began as a gesture of solidarity with the miners.
"All the workers in this country have got to take reductions in wages to help put industry on its feet", British Prime Minister Stanley Baldwin stated.
Born: Alexander Trocchi, novelist, in Glasgow, Scotland (d. 1984)
Died: William Wynn Westcott, 76, British Freemason

July 31, 1925 (Friday)
Red Friday: The British government of Stanley Baldwin averted a miners' strike by agreeing to provide a subsidy to maintain the miners' wages until a commission could study the situation.
With the Giacomo Matteotti murder trial still pending, the Italian government issued a decree granting amnesty for those arraigned on charges of "premeditated political murder" in the event that it could not be proven whether the murder was premeditated or had happened under "unforeseen circumstances".
Born: Carmel Quinn, singer and performer, in Dublin, Ireland (d. 2021)

References

1925
1925-07
1925-07